Alectra Incorporated, through its subsidiary Alectra Utilities Corporation, is an electricity utility and distributor that serves several municipalities in the Golden Horseshoe region of Ontario. It is a municipally owned corporation with shares in varying amounts held by the municipalities which owned its predecessor companies.

When it was founded, Alectra was described as the second largest municipally-owned electricity utility in North America after the Los Angeles Department of Water and Power. As of January 2019 it is the largest municipally-owned electricity utility in Canada, by number of customers served.

Formation and expansion
Alectra was formed on January 31, 2017 by the merger of the municipally-owned utilities Enersource (serving Mississauga), Horizon Utilities (serving Hamilton and St. Catharines), and PowerStream (serving portions of York Region and Simcoe County). The initial formation of the company was completed with the acquisition of Hydro One Brampton from the provincial government's Hydro One on February 28, 2017. Guelph Hydro (serving Guelph and Rockwood) merged into Alectra on January 1, 2019.

Following its formation, Alectra continued to hold the 50% ownership stake formerly held by PowerStream in Collus PowerStream (which services Collingwood and surrounding area) until 2017. Alectra announced on November 9, 2017 that it was selling its ownership stake in Collus PowerStream back to the Town of Collingwood, with the Town announcing that it was selling Collus PowerStream to EPCOR Utilities.

Corporate organization
The company is governed by a 14-member board of directors representing the municipalities and other shareholders which owned its predecessor companies. Municipal representatives make up 13 of those directors, consisting of: 4 directors from Mississauga, 3 from Vaughan, 2 from Hamilton, 2 from Markham, 1 from Barrie, 1 from St. Catharines, and 1 from Guelph. 

Employees of Alectra's predecessor companies had previously been represented by the Power Workers' Union, the International Brotherhood of Electrical Workers, and Unifor. Following a vote on June 28, 2017 the majority of unionized employees of Alectra and its subsidiaries agreed to be represented solely by the Power Workers' Union.

Service area

Single-tier municipalities
 Barrie
 Guelph
 Hamilton

Niagara Region
 St. Catharines

Peel Region
 Brampton
 Mississauga

Simcoe County
 Alliston
 Beeton
 Bradford West Gwillimbury
 Penetanguishene
 Thornton
 Tottenham

Wellington County
 Rockwood

York Region
 Aurora
 Markham
 Richmond Hill
 Vaughan

See also 
 List of Canadian electric utilities

Notes

References

External links
 

2017 establishments in Ontario
Companies based in Mississauga
Canadian companies established in 2017
Companies owned by municipalities of Canada
Electric power companies of Canada
Municipal government of Barrie
Municipal government of Mississauga
Municipal government of Hamilton, Ontario
Municipal government of Guelph
Municipal government of St. Catharines
OMERS companies